Head Balloki or Balloki Headworks is a barrage on the Ravi River in the Punjab, Pakistan.it is 70 KM distance from Lahore. It was first built around in 1915 in British India as part of the 'Triple Canals Project' to feed the Lower Bari Doab Canal. The canal turned in a profit of 24% within ten years (in 1928–29). The original weir has now been rebuilt as a full barrage.

History 

The Triple Canals project in Punjab began in 1905, soon after the completion of the Upper Bari Doab Canal (UBDC). Thus it was the second irrigation project to be implemented in Punjab. It constructed three canals:
 the Upper Jhelum Canal (UJC) from Mangla
 the Upper Chenab Canal (UCC) from Marala
 the Lower Bari Doab Canal (LBDC) from Balloki.
The Upper Chenab and Lower Bari were linked at Balloki: the former brought water from Chenab to Ravi, and recharged it after depletion into the Upper Bari Canal. The Lower Bari Doab Canal then took the combined waters from Ravi and UCC down the Bari doab for irrigating lands. 

This was the origin of the "link canal" concept, bringing waters from the western rivers into the eastern rivers of Punjab, which later became the foundation for the Indus Waters Treaty between present-day India and Pakistan.

Where the Upper Chenab joined the Ravi river from the right, a few miles west of the village of Balloki, the Balloki Barrage was constructed. It was the largest barrage of its kind in India at that time. It had a 1,647-foot-long weir with thirty-five 12-metre-wide steel gates for regulating the water of Ravi. The Lower Bari Doab Canal branched off on the left of the barrage. The canal started supplying water in 1912 and got fully completed in 1917. It irrigated 877,000 acres of land in the Montgomery and Multan districts. The total cost of the LBDC project was Rs. 22 million. It became profitable within 10 years.

See also

Rana Resort & Park

References

Bibliography
 
 
 

Kasur District
Dams in Punjab, Pakistan
Hydroelectric power stations in Pakistan
British Indian history
Dams on the Ravi River